Stirrup Iron Creek is a tributary to Crabtree Creek that rises near Brassfield, North Carolina and then flows south-southeast into Lake Crabtree. The watershed is about 31% forested.

See also
List of rivers of North Carolina

External links
City of Durham Page on Stirrup Iron Creek
Fish Brain (Stirrup Iron Creek)
Article from Herald-Sun on sewage spill in Stirrup Iron Creek

References

Rivers of North Carolina
Rivers of Wake County, North Carolina
Tributaries of Pamlico Sound